The 2022 Gasparilla Bowl was a college football bowl game played on December 23, 2022, at Raymond James Stadium in Tampa, Florida. The 14th annual Gasparilla Bowl, the game began at 6:35 p.m. EST and was aired on ESPN. The game was played between the Wake Forest Demon Deacons from the Atlantic Coast Conference and the Missouri Tigers from the Southeastern Conference. It was one of the 2022–23 bowl games concluding the 2022 FBS football season. Sponsored by mortgage loan company Union Home Mortgage, the game was officially known as the Union Home Mortgage Gasparilla Bowl.

The game began with Missouri on offense but they were unable to product a first down and had to punt. On Wake Forest's first possession, they drove for a touchdown, and Missouri responded with a field goal on their second drive. After punts by both teams, the Demon Deacons expanded their lead with another touchdown to make the score 14–3. The teams were set to trade punts again but Wake Forest's punt was muffed by Luther Burden III and recovered by the Demon Deacons, though they threw an interception which preceded a Missouri touchdown on their ensuing drive. These would be the last points of the first half, though the teams traded touchdowns early in the third quarter, the first of which saw Missouri briefly take its first lead. After that, the game went scoreless for over a full quarter, with the next points being put up by Wake Forest with a touchdown with 2:33 left in the game. After that, Missouri turned the ball over on downs and Wake Forest ended the game having won 27–17.

Teams
The Gasparilla Bowl featured the Wake Forest Demon Deacons, from the Atlantic Coast Conference (ACC), against the Missouri, from the Southeastern Conference (SEC). This was the first time that Missouri and Wake Forest had ever faced each other. The game was Wake Forest's seventh straight appearance in a bowl and their 17th overall, with a 10–6 record overall. It was Missouri's third consecutive bowl game appearance and 34th overall, and the Tigers entered the game sporting a 14–19 bowl game record overall. They entered with a three-game losing streak in bowl games; their last postseason win was in the 2015 Citrus Bowl.

This edition of the Gasparilla Bowl was the first to feature two Power Five teams, and only three other Power Five teams had played in the game previously: NC State (in 2014), Mississippi State (in 2016), and Florida (in 2021).

Wake Forest

Wake Forest finished their regular season with a 7–5 record, losing four of their final five games after starting the season with six wins in their first seven games. They faced four ranked teams during the season, defeating Florida State while losing to Clemson, NC State, and North Carolina.

One of the major headlines for Wake Forest entering the game was the impending departure of quarterback Sam Hartman; though it was not made clear before the game whether he would leave for the transfer portal or the NFL Draft, it was announced that this would be his last game at Wake Forest. While the passing offense was certainly viewed as a strength, the pass defense was analyzed to be more shaky and largely dependent on the ratio of pass plays to rush plays that were run by the opposing offense. The Demon Deacons defense was impacted by the loss of cornerbacks JJ Roberts and Gavin Holmes to the transfer portal; the latter announced his commitment to Texas two days before the game.

Missouri

Missouri finished their regular season with a 6–6 record, winning their final two games to become bowl eligible. They faced three ranked teams during the season, defeating South Carolina while losing to Georgia and Tennessee.

The Tigers were without several players due to draft preparations: defensive ends Isaiah McGuire and DJ Coleman both opted-out, as did safety Martez Manuel; these three players were Missouri's top three sack leaders throughout the season. Wide receiver Dominic Lovett did not play in the game after entering the transfer portal following Missouri's last regular season game.

Mizzou's scoring offense was brought into question by analysts, as Wake Forest entered the game with a 2–5 record in games when they allowed over 30 points (in contrast, they had a 5–0 record when allowing fewer) but the Tigers had only reached the 30-point mark three times over the course of the regular season.

Game summary
The game was televised on ESPN, with a commentary team of Chris Cotter, Aaron Murray, and Lericia Harris. The game's officiating crew, representing the Big 12 Conference, was led by referee Kevin Boitmann and umpire Apollo Martin.

First half
The game began with Ivan Mora's opening kickoff that gave Missouri the ball on their own 35-yard-line. The Tigers went three-and-out on their first drive and punted to the Demon Deacons and gave them the ball for their first possession at their own 15-yard-line. Wake Forest started strongly on offense, as Sam Hartman found A.T. Perry for a 30-yard completion early on to move them past midfield. Several gains on the ground brought them to the Missouri 5-yard-line, where they scored the game's first touchdown on a 5-yard pass from Hartman to Taylor Morin. Missouri responded with a long, 15-play drive that spanned 58 yards and took nearly eight minutes off of the clock. They began after a touchback on their own 25-yard-line and successfully converted third downs on three occasions before failing to convert 3rd & 13 at the Wake Forest 19-yard-line. On the next play, Missouri scored their first points with a 35-yard field goal by Harrison Mevis. This left 1:46 on the clock and Wake Forest took all but ten seconds with a three-and-out and a punt to the Missouri 30-yard-line. The Tigers ran one play, a 10-yard rush by Brady Cook, before the quarter ended.

Missouri began the second quarter with a three-and-out, as they failed to gain the required five yards that remained and punted to the Wake Forest 37-yard-line following a fair catch. Wake Forest expanded their lead with a second touchdown drive to begin their first possession of the quarter, starting with a 27-yard pass from Hartman to Donavon Greene followed immediately by a 12-yard pass to Jahmal Banks, which reached the Missouri 24-yard-line. They stalled for several plays but ended up converting on 4th & 1 with an offside penalty against Missouri, and scored three plays later with a Justice Ellison rush. The teams then traded punts; Missouri set themselves back with a false start penalty and were unable to recover, punting on 4th & 16, and the Demon Deacons had to punt after a less successful five plays, though they got the ball back immediately after the punt was muffed by Luther Burden III. They were unable to take full advantage as Hartman threw an interception to Jaylon Carlies in the end zone, giving Missouri a touchback. Missouri, on the other hand, were able to take advantage of this mistake with a 7-play touchdown drive capped off by a 1-yard pass from Cook to Demariyon Houston. Wake Forest managed to convert a pair of third downs on their last drive of the half but ultimately faced 4th & 9 and had to punt; the Tigers reached the Wake Forest 31-yard-line with a 12-yard pass from Cook to Mookie Cooper on the final play of the half but were unable to run another play as time expired with Wake Forest leading by four points.

Second half
Wake Forest opened the second half promisingly, with a pair of Hartman-to-Perry passes that gained a first down, though they stalled from there and punted on 4th & 2, giving Missouri the ball on their own 17-yard-line. The teams then traded touchdowns, though in different ways: Missouri scored to take their first lead of the game on a 13-play drive that took nearly six and a half minutes off of the clock, with a touchdown eventually coming on a 4-yard rush by Cody Schrader, while Wake Forest drove 75 yards in four plays thanks to gains of 15 and 12 yards on passes that set up a 48-yard touchdown strike from Hartman to Banks. Matthew Dennis missed the extra point, keeping Wake Forest's lead at three points. After that, the teams traded three-and-outs, with Missouri digging themselves into a hole with a holding penalty on second down and ultimately kicking it away on 4th & 17, and Wake Forest picking up possession at their own 25-yard-line and advancing only five yards from there before they punted it back to their own 49-yard-line. Missouri was unable to take advantage of the good field position, as they committed a turnover on downs after failing to convert 4th & 4 from the Wake Forest 43-yard-line after Cook's pass fell incomplete. On their next drive, the Demon Deacons were unable to find more success, as they faced 4th & 1 before a holding penalty set them back ten yards and sent the game into the fourth quarter.

The first play of the final quarter saw Wake Forest punt to Missouri, with a fair catch setting the Tigers up at their own 19-yard-line. Two passes and a rush by Cook picked up a first down, and a 12-yard pass two plays later put the ball on the 50-yard-line. after gaining 7 yards on their next two plays, the Missouri gained none on their next two, and turned the ball over on downs again. With under ten minutes to play, Wake Forest again failed to move the ball and punted on 4th & 18; the 31-yard kick gave Missouri the ball at their own 15-yard-line after Kris Abrams-Draine's fair catch. A 4th & 4 on Missouri's next series forced them into a similar outcome after a second-down sack took them from needing two yards to needing nine. Wake Forest fielded the punt on their own 25-yard-line and sparked their offense to an eight-play drive that included a roughing the passer penalty and a 15-yard rush by Ellison later on. The drive finished with a 16-yard touchdown pass from Hartman to Morin with 2:33 left on the clock, a play which extended the Demon Deacons' lead to ten points. Needing a score late in the game, Missouri's offense was set back by a loss of 12 yards resulting from a Kobie Turner sack, and they fell further behind the sticks with another sack, this one for a loss of 11 yards by Rondell Bothroyd, on the next play. They failed to convert 4th & 33 two plays later and gave the ball back to the Demon Deacons with one minute remaining; Wake Forest took a knee to run the clock out and secure a victory, 27–17.

Scoring summary

Statistics

See also
 2023 ReliaQuest Bowl, contested at the same venue on January 2

References

Gasparilla Bowl
Gasparilla Bowl
Gasparilla Bowl
Gasparilla Bowl